Bellegem is a village situated in West Flanders, Belgium, near the city of Kortrijk. In 2013, it had a population of 3,790.

Gallery

Trivia
On 4 July 1989, an unmanned Soviet MiG 23 fighter crashed on top of a house in Bellegem, killing one inhabitant.

See also
 List of World Beer Cup awards

Sub-municipalities of Kortrijk
Populated places in West Flanders